Justin Ashley Lucas is a former professional American football player who played cornerback for six seasons for the Arizona Cardinals (1999-2003) and St. Louis Rams (2004). He appeared in 65 NFL games, eight as a starter. He also played college football for Abilene Christian in 1997 and 1998.

References

1976 births
Living people
People from Victoria, Texas
American football cornerbacks
Abilene Christian Wildcats football players
Texas A&M Aggies football players
Arizona Cardinals players
St. Louis Rams players